Game Informer (GI, most often stylized gameinformer from the 2010s onward) is an American monthly video game magazine featuring articles, news, strategy, and reviews of video games and associated consoles. It debuted in August 1991 when video game retailer FuncoLand started publishing an in-house newsletter. The publication is now owned and published by GameStop, who bought FuncoLand in 2000. Due to this, a large amount of promotion is done in-store, which has contributed to the success of the magazine. As of June 2017, it is the 5th most popular magazine by copies circulated.

Starting from the 2010s, Game Informer has transitioned to a more online-based focus.

History

Magazine

Game Informer debuted in August 1991 as a six-page magazine. It was published every two months until November 1994, when the magazine began to be released monthly.

Since 2001 Game Informer has been published by Cathy Preston, who has been working as part of the production team since 2000. It was under her that the publication became an integral part of GameStop's customer loyalty program, Power Up Rewards.

In 2010, Game Informer became the 5th largest magazine in the US with 5 million copies sold, ahead of popular publications like Time, Sports Illustrated, and Playboy. By 2011, Game Informer had become the 3rd largest magazine in the US topping 8 million copies circulated. However, in 2014 it had fallen to 4th place with 6.9 million copies sold. Recent figures still place the magazine at 4th place with over 7 million copies sold. The financial success of Game Informer has been attributed to its good relationship with publishers, ties to GameStop, and the lack of gaming-magazine competition.

The April edition of Game Informer includes 'an annual feature Game Infarcer, an April Fools' Day prank. In the cover box head appears "World's #1 Pretend Magazine" where would ordinarily appear "World's #1 Video Game Magazine" -- "Parody" is found at the cover bottom. Game Infarcer articles are accredited to the fictional editor-in-chief Darth Clark, who is addressed in hate mail every year sent to Game Informer. The heated responses to parody articles are often featured in later Game Informer issues.

Game Informer has included four "Sacred Cow Barbecues". Similar in style to a celebrity roast, the occasion is meant to "knock some of gaming's most revered icons off their high and mighty pedestals". The first Sacred Cow Barbecues  featured in issue 158 (June 2006). Other issues featuring Sacred Cow Barbecues are: 183 (July 2008), 211 (November 2010), and 261 (January 2015). Sacred Cow Barbecues articles are considered controversial among those gamers who aren't amused by their favorite games being mocked.

In August 2019, after months of declining financials for GameStop, about half of the current Game Informer staff were let go, part of the larger cut of more than 120 jobs by GameStop as part of the store's effort to improve their financial performance. These included some staff members that had been working at Game Informer for over 10 years, some were out on vacation during the time of the layoff. As a result of the layoff, other Game Informer staff also left of their own will, including video editor Ben Hanson. Ben Hanson eventually started his own podcast called MinnMax, in the process recruiting some of the Gameinformer staff that was laid off. In March 2020 there was again another set of layoffs at Gameinformer, this time not affecting editors but instead people who worked in other departments of Gameinformer.

In late June 2020, longtime editor-in-chief and founder Andy McNamara announced he was leaving Game Informer, to be the Global Director of Integrated Comms for Shooters & Star Wars at Electronic Arts, and that former senior editor Andrew Reiner would be taking his place as editor-in-chief. Andy McNamara did eventually say that the layoffs had a big impact on him deciding to move on from Gameinformer.

On November 4, 2021, the official website announced that every issue from then on would have a small print run variant known as Game Informer Gold. This version boasted high quality paper and an alternate cover, as well as being limited to 50 copies. The first copy was given away on November 6 for their Extra Life charity livestream.

In the summer of 2022, there was once again another set of layoffs, with three Gameinformer staff being cut. Andrew Reiner saw the writing on the wall and left Gameinformer in September 2022 to become a game developer, thus leaving Gameinformer with no original staff. Matt Miller, who has been in Gameinformer for over 10 years, was promoted to editor-in-chief. In Fall 2022, Kyle Hilliard (who was previously laid off) returned to Gameinformer.

Website
Game Informer Online was originally launched in August 1996 and featured daily news updates as well as articles. Justin Leeper and Matthew Kato were hired on in November 1999 as full-time web editors. As part of the GameStop purchase of the magazine, this original GameInformer.com site was closed around January 2001. Both Leeper and Kato were eventually placed on the editorial staff of the magazine.

GI Online was revived, at the same domain name, in September 2003, with a full redesign and many additional features, such as a review database, frequent news updates, and exclusive "Unlimited" content for subscribers. It was managed by Billy Berghammer, creator of PlanetGameCube.com (now known as NintendoWorldReport.com). Berghammer is currently the editor in chief at EGM Media Group 

In March 2009, the online staff began creating the code for what would be the latest redesign to date. The redesign was to release hand-in-hand with the magazine's own redesign. On October 1, 2009, the newly redesigned website was live, with a welcome message from Editor-In-Chief Andy McNamara. Many new features were introduced, including a rebuilt media player, a feed highlighting the site activity of the website's users, and the ability to create user reviews. At the same time, the magazine's podcast, The Game Informer Show, was launched.

Each year in January or February, Game Informer's editors count and judge the "Top 50 Games of [last year]". The games are sorted in order of release date. They do not have rankings, but they do commemorate special games with awards like Game of the Year and other examples. They also have top ten charts of differing categories, both in the "Top 50" section of the website and in the regular magazine.

In August each year, Game Informer includes an "E3 Hot 50", a special section that reviews the year's E3 (Electronic Entertainment Expo) and most to all of its games, which also temporarily replaces the "Previews" section of the print edition.

Australian edition
In November 2009, Game Informer was launched in Australia by former Australian GamePro, Gameplayer and Official PlayStation Magazine editor Chris Stead and publisher Citrus Media. By June 2010, Game Informer Australia had become the first local games publication to pass 10,000 subscribers. By August 18, 2010, it had become Australia's biggest-selling video games publication.

Game Informer Australia was closed down on April 18, 2019, as a result of cost-cutting measures from its publishing company EB Games Australia.

GI Australia editor David Milner noted on Twitter that despite the fact that "readership was up 19% over the last year", that "Recent ad sales, however, did not really reflect this"; he also noted the failed attempt at EB Games Australia's corporate parent GameStop to find a buyer after months on the market, causing their shares to drop.

Reviews
Game Informer currently reviews games on PCs; consoles including PlayStation 5, PlayStation 4, PlayStation VR, Xbox Series X, Xbox One and Nintendo Switch; and mobile devices running Android and iOS. Older games, three per issue, were given brief reviews in the magazine's "Classic GI" section (compared with the game's original review score, if one exists). This was discontinued in 2009, months before the redesign of the magazine. The magazine's staff rate games on a scale of 1 to 10 with quarter-point intervals. A score of 1 to 5 is considered terrible (in many issues, 1 is noted as a joke reason for the score, for instance, "Duplicates in lootboxes" in issue 295); 6 to 7 is "average", a decently playable, and sometimes fun (but flawed) game; and 10 is a rare, "outstanding", nearly perfect game.

Notes

References

External links
 
Archived Game Informer Magazines at the Wayback Machine 
Archived Game Informer Magazines on Retro CDN

1991 establishments in Minnesota
Monthly magazines published in the United States
Video game magazines published in the United States
GameStop
Magazines established in 1991
Magazines published in Minnesota
Mass media in Minneapolis–Saint Paul
Spike Video Game Award winners